1E is a UK software company.

1E or 1-E may also refer to:
1st meridian east, a longitude coordinate
 ISS 1E
 Astra 1E, a communications satellite owned and operated by SES, and launched in 1995
 California Proposition 1E (2009), a defeated California ballot proposition
 1E, UIC classification of the 2-10-0 train arrangement*1E, a designator of celestial objects discovered via Einstein Observatory

See also
E1 (disambiguation)